Michael Boynton Jr. (born January 17, 1982) is an American basketball coach. He is the head men's basketball coach at the Oklahoma State University–Stillwater.

Playing career
A native of Brooklyn, New York, Boynton led his high school basketball team at Bishop Loughlin Memorial High School to the city semifinals and earned first team All-New York City honors by averaging 15.0 points, 4.0 rebounds and 11.0 assists per game.

While a player for the University of South Carolina Gamecocks from 2000 to 2004, Boynton made 129 three-pointers in 125 career games, finishing in the top ten in three-pointers made and fourth in career games played with the Gamecocks. Boynton and the Gamecocks made the 2004 NCAA Tournament. Boynton finished his playing career at South Carolina with a degree in African-American Studies.

Coaching career
Boynton's post-playing basketball career began as a graduate manager at Furman in 2004–05. He then moved on to be an assistant coach at Coastal Carolina University from 2005 to 2007 before moving to Wofford College (South Carolina) for the 2007–08 season as associate head coach. Boynton returned to Columbia for the 2008–09 season as an assistant coach and stayed until 2013. Boynton moved with fellow assistant Brad Underwood when the latter became the head coach at Stephen F. Austin State University, commencing with the 2013–14 season. When Underwood accepted the head coaching position at Oklahoma State, Boynton moved to Stillwater, Oklahoma to serve as an assistant coach.

On March 24, 2017, Boynton was named the 20th head coach of the Oklahoma State University men's basketball team following Underwood's departure for Illinois.

Head coaching record

Personal life
Boynton is married to Jenny Boynton. They have one son and one daughter. Coach Boynton also has three older daughters. Boynton is a Christian.

References

External links
 Oklahoma State profile

1982 births
Living people
African-American basketball coaches
African-American basketball players
American men's basketball coaches
American men's basketball players
Basketball coaches from New York (state)
Basketball players from New York City
Bishop Loughlin Memorial High School alumni
Coastal Carolina Chanticleers men's basketball coaches
College men's basketball head coaches in the United States
Furman Paladins men's basketball coaches
Oklahoma State Cowboys basketball coaches
Point guards
South Carolina Gamecocks men's basketball coaches
South Carolina Gamecocks men's basketball players
Sportspeople from Brooklyn
Stephen F. Austin Lumberjacks basketball coaches
Wofford Terriers men's basketball coaches
21st-century African-American sportspeople
20th-century African-American people